Kandis may refer to:
 Kandis (Kingdom), an ancient kingdom in Sumatra, Indonesia
 Rock candy, confectionery mineral composed of large sugar crystals
 Kandis (band), Danish dance band
 Garcinia forbesii, a plant with the common name kandis

See also
Kandi (disambiguation)
Kändisdjungeln, the first season of the Swedish version of I'm a Celebrity...Get Me Out of Here!
Kandis Kola, a village in Panjak-e Rastaq Rural District, Kojur District, Nowshahr County, Mazandaran Province, Iran